Limerick Station also known as Colbert Station or Limerick Colbert serves the city of Limerick in County Limerick. It is on Parnell Street and is the main station on the Limerick Suburban Rail network. It has approximately 2,500 rail passengers a day travelling on four rail routes. The Bus Éireann bus station on site services approximately one million passengers a year, with 125 buses departing each day.

Services
The station is the terminus of the Dublin–Limerick, Limerick–Nenagh–Ballybrophy and Limerick–Ennis–Galway lines. Connections for Cork, Clonmel, Carrick-on-Suir, Waterford and Kerry stations, such as Killarney, Farranfore and Tralee can be made at Limerick Junction.

Bus Éireann's Limerick depot is adjacent and offers Intercity, Express and Eurolines services.

Connecting to Shannon Airport
Buses connect the railway station to Shannon Airport.

History

The station opened on 28 August 1858, replacing a temporary station  further east, which had operated from 9 May 1848. It was built by the Waterford and Limerick Railway (W&LR), which ran its first train, as far as Tipperary, on Tuesday, 9 May 1848, with intermediate stations at Killonan, Pallasgreen and Oola (all since closed). Two months later the GS&WR connected their Dublin–Cork line with the W&LR at Limerick Junction, near Tipperary. The work was carried out at the height of the Great Famine, resulting in extreme financial difficulties for the company.

Originally named "Limerick", the station was given the name Colbert on 10 April 1966 in commemoration of Cornelius Colbert, one of the executed leaders of the Easter Rising of 1916.

Other former routes from Limerick station included: 
 a direct route to Cork via Patrickswell and Charleville (on the Dublin-Cork line) built by the Cork & Limerick Direct Railway
 the "North Kerry" line to Foynes, Newcastle West, Listowel and Tralee built in stages by three different companies in the mid to late 19th century
 a siding from Limerick Check to Castlemungret cement factory. 
The direct line to Cork between Patrickswell and Charleville and the North Kerry line between Ballingrane and Tralee were dismantled in the [late 1960s - to be confirmed] and in the late 1980s respectively. A single-track remains in place between Limerick Check and Foynes, although disconnected from the network.

Parts of the video for the Westlife song "My Love" were filmed at Colbert Station.

Redevelopment 
Conditional planning permission was granted by Limerick city and county council for the €16.8m redevelopment of Colbert Station in December 2014.

Plan included:

Phase 1. A new pedestrian plaza limestone paved area of  replacing the car park at the front of the station.

Phase 2. Knocking the former toilet block to make way for a new bus station, with the former bus station being converted into the access area for a new 235-space car park.

Phase 3. Significant refurbishment of the interior of the railway station with new finishes throughout and provision of a new ticketing office and retail units.

Funding of approximately 3 million euro was secured for Phase 1 and work began in Quarter 1, 2015.  
The disused Fuel Station site was leveled and work completed on-site for a temporary car park in summer/autumn 2015. The temporary parking was used while work on station redevelopment took place. Phase 1 was completed in 2016.

During June 2017, extensive re-signalling works took place at Limerick Colbert. These works replaced two life-expired signal cabins that signaled all routes into and out of the station. During this time, platforms 3 and 4 were also straightened, lengthened and resurfaced.

In October 2017, one of the former Station Signal cabins was demolished to facilitate the extension of Platforms 1 and 2. Buffer stop arrangements to comply with modern safety requirements, similar to those on Platforms 3 & 4 were also provided for.

Separately Limerick council sought in 2015 to redevelop the Parnell Street area including the interface between the street and Colbert station. Plans included a raised platform and new pedestrian crossing across Parnell Street at the entry to Colbert Station to complement the new pedestrian plaza. Work was completed in 2017.

See also
 List of railway stations in Ireland
 Limerick Suburban Rail
 Great Southern and Western Railway
 History of rail transport in Ireland

References

External links

Irish Rail Limerick (Colbert) station Website
Limerick–Clonmel–Waterford & Nenagh lines

Iarnród Éireann stations in County Limerick
Railway stations in County Limerick
Railway stations opened in 1858
Buildings and structures in Limerick (city)